Stuart Bingham (born 21 May 1976) is an English professional snooker player who is a former World Champion and Masters winner. 

Bingham won the 1996 World Amateur Championship but enjoyed little sustained success in the early part of his professional career. His form improved in his mid-thirties: at age 35, he won his first ranking title at the 2011 Australian Goldfields Open, which helped him enter the top 16 in the rankings for the first time.

At 38, Bingham won the 2015 World Championship, defeating Shaun Murphy 18–15 in the final. The oldest first-time world champion in snooker history, he was the second player, after Ken Doherty, to have won world titles at both amateur and professional levels. His world title took him to a career-high number two in the world rankings, a spot he held until March 2017. He won his second Triple Crown title at the 2020 Masters, defeating Ali Carter 10–8 in the final. Aged 43 years and 243 days, he superseded Ray Reardon as the oldest Masters' champion. In 2017, Bingham received a six month competition ban for breaching rules concerning betting on matches involving himself and other players.

A prolific break-builder, Bingham has compiled over 550 century breaks during his career. He has scored nine career maximum breaks, the fourth most of any player, behind only Ronnie O'Sullivan (15), John Higgins (12), and Stephen Hendry (11).

Career

Early career (1995–2010)
In 1996, Bingham won both the English Amateur and the World Amateur Championships. Bingham played professionally on the World Snooker Tour in 1999 and reached the quarter-final stage of the Welsh Open, defeating the world champion John Higgins along the way. Later in the season, he defeated defending champion Stephen Hendry 10–7 in the first round of the 2000 World Championship, whilst ranked 97th in the world. Jimmy White defeated him in the second round. In 2002, he qualified again for the tournament by beating Nigel Bond in the final qualifying round. Bingham played Ken Doherty in the first round. He attempted a maximum break but missed the final . The break would have been worth £167,000. He lost the match 8–10.

In the 2004–05 season his best runs were two last 16 places in ranking events, including losing a deciding frame to Ding Junhui in the China Open. Bingham had one of his most consistent seasons in 2005–06. He reached the quarter-finals of the Grand Prix, beating then world champion Shaun Murphy along the way. Bingham got to the same stage of the UK Championship, losing in a deciding frame to Joe Perry. Bingham also won the qualifying tournament for the 2006 Masters, where he made his first maximum break. He then beat Steve Davis in the preliminary round, before losing to Peter Ebdon 4–6 in the first round. Bingham finished the season by qualifying for the 2006 World Snooker Championship, where he lost to Ryan Day. He finished in the top 32 of the world rankings for the first time in his career. At the Masters' qualifying tournament for the 2007 event, Bingham won for a second successive season, defeating Mark Selby 6–2 in the final. He lost 5–6 in the preliminary round to Ali Carter. He lost in qualifying for the 2007 World Snooker Championship in the final round, 5–10 to Fergal O'Brien.

He reached the quarter-finals of the 2007 Shanghai Masters, but Selby defeated him 0–5. At the UK Championship, Bingham reached the last 16, losing to Murphy 3–9, after victories over Fergal O'Brien and Davis. He qualified for the 2008 World Snooker Championship with a 10–3 win over Adrian Gunnell in the final qualifying round. In the opening round of the event, he beat Davis 10–8 but lost in the second round 9–13 to Perry. Bingham lost in the first round in four of the eight events of the 2008–09 season. He was drawn against world number one Ronnie O'Sullivan in the first round of the 2009 World Championship, losing 5–10. Bingham reached the quarter-final stages of the 2010 UK Championship having defeated O'Sullivan 9–6 and Marco Fu 9–2 before losing 7–9 to Mark Allen. Later that season, Bingham qualified for the 2011 World Snooker Championship and beat former champion Ebdon 10–8 in the first round. In the second round he led Ding 12–9 but lost 12–13; had he won, Bingham would have finished in the top 16 in the world rankings for the first time.

First ranking event victory (2011–14)
At the 2011 Australian Goldfields Open, Bingham defeated Ding 5–3 in the opening round, completed a whitewash over Tom Ford, then secured victories over Allen and Murphy to reach the final. Trailing 5–8 to Mark Williams, Bingham won four frames to win 9–8 and collect $60,000 for the first prize. This, the first ranking event win of his 16-year professional career, was enough to put Bingham up to 11th in the world rankings, and secure a place in the 2012 Masters. He drew Judd Trump in the first round and led 3–2 before losing four frames in a row to exit the tournament 3–6. Bingham could not recapture the form he showed in Australia in the remaining seven ranking events, failing to get past the second round in any of them. A 4–10 loss to Stephen Hendry in the first round of the World Championship ended the 2012 season. Despite the defeat, Bingham finished 16th in the world rankings.

Bingham won the 2012 Premier League Snooker tournament and contested two ranking event finals in the 2012–13 snooker season.
He won the first two non-ranking tournaments beginning with the Pink Ribbon Pro-Am charity tournament where he whitewashed Peter Lines 4–0 in the final. Bingham followed this up by claiming the first Asian Players Tour Championship with a 4–3 victory over Stephen Lee. Bingham won deciding frames in each of his matches to reach the final of the Wuxi Classic, overcoming Peter Ebdon, Ken Doherty, world number one Mark Selby and Mark Davis. He played Ricky Walden but trailed 1–7 at the conclusion of the afternoon's play, before eventually losing 4–10. This ended Bingham's winning start to the season, which had seen him take 16 matches in a row. He was unable to defend his Australian Goldfields Open title losing to Matthew Selt in the first round 4–5.

Bingham won the third event of the Asian Players Tour Championship with a 4–3 victory over Li Hang in the final. He also won the Premier League, defeating Judd Trump 7–2 in the final. At the UK Championship, he reached the quarter-finals but lost 4–6 to Carter. He reached the final 2013 Welsh Open, and led  Stephen Maguire 7–5 but eventually lost 8–9. At the 2013 World Snooker Championship, Bingham played world number 83 Sam Baird in the first round, winning 10–2, and Mark Davis in the second round, winning 13–10. Ronnie O'Sullivan defeated him 4–13 in the quarter-finals. He climbed 10 places in the rankings during the season, ending it ranked world number six.

As the 2012 Premier League Snooker winner, Bingham was one of 16 players invited to compete in the 2013 Champion of Champions tournament. He defeated Walden 4–0 in the first round, Trump 6–2 in the quarter-finals, and Selby 6–4 in the semi-finals before losing 8–10 in the final to O'Sullivan. He defeated Jimmy White 6–2, Anthony McGill 6–2, David Morris 6–1, and O'Sullivan 6–4 to reach the semi-finals of the 2013 UK Championship. Robertson led Bingham 8–3 in the semi-final, before Bingham won five frames to force a deciding frame. Robertson took the frame to clinch a 9–8 victory. He reached the final of the Shoot-Out but lost to Dominic Dale. Bingham travelled to China and won the minor-ranking Dongguan Open by seeing off Liang Wenbo 4–1 in the final. Ken Doherty defeated Bingham in the 2014 World Snooker Championship 10–5.

World Snooker Champion (2014–18)

Bingham defeated Li Hang, Dominic Dale, Alan McManus and Ding at the 2014 Shanghai Masters to reach the final. From 5–3 ahead against Allen, Bingham took five unanswered frames to claim his second ranking title with a 10–3 win. In October, he won the Haining Open by defeating Oliver Lines 4–0 in the final. Bingham reached the semi-final of the UK Championship again in the 2014 event. Though he made a 137 break to establish a 4–1 lead over O'Sullivan he lost 6–5. Bingham won the non-ranking Championship League by beating Mark Davis 3–2. O'Sullivan was again the winner when the pair met in the semi-finals of the inaugural World Grand Prix, whitewashing Bingham 6–0. A further semi-final followed at the PTC Grand Final, but he lost 4–1 to eventual champion Joe Perry.

At the 2015 World Snooker Championship, Bingham defeated Robbie Williams 10–7, Graeme Dott 13–5 and O'Sullivan 13–9 to reach the semi-finals. Bingham led Trump 16–14, and despite Trump winning the next two frames, Bingham won the match 17–16 to reach his first Triple Crown final. Facing Murphy in the final, Bingham recovered from 3–0 and 8–4 down to win 18–15. He commented, "To beat Shaun in the final tops everything off. Twenty years as professional – blood, sweat and tears on the road." After the event, Bingham climbed to world number two, the highest ranking of his career.

Bingham progressed to the semi-finals of the Shanghai Masters but lost 6–3 to Judd Trump. At the 2016 Masters, he beat Ding Junhui 6–4 and John Higgins 6–3 to face Ronnie O'Sullivan in the semi-finals and was defeated 6–3. He overcame a 3–0 deficit to eliminate Joe Perry in the semi-finals 6–5 at the World Grand Prix and reached his first final of the year. In the final, Murphy won 10–9. Bingham lost 5–1 in the quarter-finals of the China Open to Ricky Walden. Defending his title at the 2016 World Snooker Championship, he lost in the opening round 9–10 to Carter.

Bingham made it to the final of the Six-red World Championship against Ding. It was decided on the final , which Ding won. Bingham conceded just three frames as he progressed through to the semi-finals of the 2016 Shanghai Masters. He led Selby 5–3 but lost the next three frames 5–6. Bingham lost by the same scoreline in the semi-finals of the English Open, this time to Liang Wenbo. A third ranking event semi-final of the season arrived at the International Championship, but Selby defeated Bingham 9–3 after he had been 2–0 ahead. He reached the invitational China Championship final and was 7–7 with John Higgins, who made three century breaks in a row to beat him 10–7. Bingham exited the Masters in the first round, losing 6–1 to eventual finalist Joe Perry; he lost in the semi-finals of the German Masters 6–4 to Anthony Hamilton.

Bingham reached the final of the 2017 Welsh Open, where he played Trump. He won the first four frames but trailed 8–7. Bingham then won the two frames he needed to claim his fourth ranking title and first since winning the world title. In the second round of the World Championship, he lost the first five frames against Kyren Wilson, who beat him 13–10. Bingham said he would be working with Terry Griffiths for the following season and would be playing with a new cue.
However, on 24 October 2017, Bingham was found guilty of breaking World Professional Billiards and Snooker Association rules concerning betting on matches involving himself and other players. He received a six-month ban for betting breaches and was ordered to pay £20,000 in costs. The ban expired at the end of January 2018.

Return from ban and Masters champion (2018–present) 
On returning from the ban, Bingham won the 2018 English Open with a 9–7 win over veteran Mark Davis in the final. He reached the semi-finals of the UK Championship in December 2018, losing in a deciding frame to Mark Allen. At the 2019 Welsh Open, Bingham reached the final but lost 7–9 to Neil Robertson. The following month, he won his second ranking title of the season, the Gibraltar Open, beating defending champion Ryan Day 4–1 in the final.

Bingham reached his first Masters final at the 2020 event. He defeated Williams, Wilson and David Gilbert to meet Carter in the final. Despite trailing after the first session, Bingham won the match 10–8 to win his second Triple Crown. In winning the event, he became the tournament's 24th and oldest winner, superseding Ray Reardon, who was five months younger when he won the 1976 Masters. He earned £250,000 in prize money.

In November 2020, Bingham made the seventh maximum break of his career in the first round of the 2020 UK Championship, beating Zak Surety by six frames to two. However, he lost to Dott in the last 32. Despite being Masters champion, Bingham was no longer ranked in the top 16, so had to qualify for the 2021 World Snooker Championship. He defeated Luca Brecel 10–5 in the final qualifying round to reach the mainstages. He drew Ding Junhui in the first round, and beat him 10–9. In the second round, he defeated Jamie Jones 13–6, and then Anthony McGill in the quarter-finals. He played Selby in the semi-final but lost 15–17, accusing Selby of possible gamesmanship.

Legacy
Bingham has completed over 500 century breaks in professional competition, putting him tenth on the all-time list. Having made nine maximum breaks, he has made the fourth most of any player behind O'Sullivan (15), Higgins (12) and Hendry (11). Doherty and Bingham are the only players to have won both the amateur and professional world snooker championships.

Personal life
Bingham married Michelle Shabi in 2013 in a ceremony held in Cyprus. He moved the date of his wedding and cancelled his bachelor's party to make sure he could play in snooker competitions. The couple have a son, Shae, born in 2011; a daughter, Marnie Rose, born in January 2017; and Michelle's daughter Tegan, born in 2003. Bingham was once a keen amateur golfer, but made the decision to play less golf so that he could focus on snooker.

Bingham is nicknamed "ball run", given to him during his amateur career as he was perceived to have more luck than other players.

Performance and rankings timeline

Career finals

Ranking finals: 11 (6 titles)

Minor-ranking finals: 4 (4 titles)

Non-ranking finals: 16 (8 titles)

Pro-am finals: 13 (11 titles)

Amateur finals: 4 (2 titles)

References

External links

 Stuart Bingham at worldsnooker.com
 Media Appearance requests 

English snooker players
Sportspeople from Basildon
1976 births
Living people
Winners of the professional snooker world championship